Luiz Felipe Ventura dos Santos (born 22 February 1984 in Rio de Janeiro), known as Felipe, is a Brazilian footballer who plays as a goalkeeper for Botafogo-PB.

Career

Early career
Felipe began his career in Vitória (BA) before being signed by São Caetano in September 2005 until end of year. He was the first choice keeper for Vitória in 2005 Campeonato Brasileiro Série B, played 15 out of 21 games.

In 2006, he signed for Bragantino. In April 2006, he left for Campeonato Brasileiro Série B side Portuguesa, competed the start-up place with Tiago Campagnaro. In 2007 season he finished as the losing finalists in 2007 Campeonato Paulista with Bragantino.

On 24 April 2007, he was signed for Corinthians along with four of his teammates: Kadu, Moradei, Everton Leandro and Zelão.

Corinthians
He made his league debut for Corinthians, on 13 May 2007, in a win 1–0 against Juventude, and immediately established himself as Corinthian's starting goalkeeper. Felipe wore the number 1 shirt at the club.

In 2008, Corinthians only owned 50% economic rights of Felipe, and his former club Bragantino owned 25% and the rest was owned by "Mamabru Participações".

Braga
In summer 2010, Genoa and Corinthians formed a deal to sign Felipe, as Genoa has loaned their first choice keeper Marco Amelia to A.C. Milan, and the Brazilian side signed Aldo Bobadilla as replacement. But the deal was not yet completed due to FIGC decided to reduce the numbers of registration quota of non-EU players signed from abroad, from 2 to 1 on 2 July. It was reported that Genoa kept the quota for future signing instead for Felipe. Genoa eventually signed Rafinha and Felipe terminated his contract with Corinthians on 5 August 2010. On 9 August 2010 he was signed by Olé Brasil.

On 9 August 2010, Sporting Braga signed him on loan from unnamed club, as the club had sold it keepers Eduardo to Genoa and Paweł Kieszek to Porto, moreover, it new signing former Portuguese internationals Quim was injured. Braga also loaned their youth product Mário Felgueiras (who played in UEFA Champions League third qualifying round) after signed Felipe.

Felipe then immediately included in the starting line-up, in the 3–1 won against Portimonense in the opening match of 2010–11 Portuguese Liga, ahead another new signing Artur on 13 August 2010.

Flamengo
After a short stint on Braga, Felipe returned to Brazil on a one-year loan to Flamengo, with an option for the Rio club to purchase him in 2011, and with a rescision clause in case of disciplinary problems, added by the request of Patrícia Amorim, president of Flamengo, due to the controversial Bruno case. His signing was a bet from coach Vanderlei Luxemburgo. Felipe made his debut on a friendly match against Londrina, which ended in a goalless draw. During the match, Londrina were awarded a penalty kick, which was defended by Felipe.

Felipe soon fell in the graces of the rubro-negro supporters after defending two penalty kicks in the Taça Guanabara semifinals against Botafogo and for performing well at another semi-final match, this time against Fluminense where Flamengo advanced to the Taça Rio finals. Flamengo defeated rivals Vasco da Gama at the Taça Rio finals, winning the Campeonato Carioca and being crowned as the best goalkeeper of the tournament.

On the farewell match of Dejan Petkovic, Felipe made four important saves, preventing his former club Corinthians from winning the match and 'spoiling' the Serbians' final match for Flamengo. Felipe renewed his contract with Flamengo to December 2015 in January 2012, with his rights being purchased for R$ 3 million from Olé Brasil.

On 27 January 2015 Felipe had his contract canceled by Flamengo.

Figueirense
On 24 April 2015, Felipe joined Figueirense along with Carlos Alberto.

Style of play
He is reportedly tipped to be one of the best goalkeepers of Campeonato Paulista, known for his spectacular saves, great judgement and the ability to read the ball well. He is most importantly known for his skill at restarting the match after suffering a goal replacing quickly the ball and sending it to the center of the field showing the awareness in the game flow.

Career statistics
Updated 13 March 2013

Note: State Leagues are marked as League Cup, statistics available only since 2007.

Honours

Club
Vitória
Bahia State League: 2003, 2004, 2005
Bahia State Superleague: 2002

Corinthians
Brazilian Série B: 2008
Campeonato Paulista: 2009
Copa do Brasil: 2009

Flamengo
Campeonato Carioca: 2011, 2014
Copa do Brasil: 2013

International
Brazil U-17
South American Under 17 Football Championship: 2001

Individual
2011 Campeonato Carioca Best Goalkeeper

References

External links
 futpedia  
 CBF 
 
 placar 
 Guardian Stats Centre
 
 

1984 births
Living people
Brazilian footballers
Brazilian expatriate footballers
Association football goalkeepers
Campeonato Brasileiro Série A players
Primeira Liga players
Campeonato Brasileiro Série B players
Campeonato Brasileiro Série C players
Nemzeti Bajnokság I players
Esporte Clube Vitória players
Associação Desportiva São Caetano players
Clube Atlético Bragantino players
Associação Portuguesa de Desportos players
Sport Club Corinthians Paulista players
CR Flamengo footballers
Figueirense FC players
S.C. Braga players
Kisvárda FC players
Botafogo Futebol Clube (PB) players
Expatriate footballers in Portugal
Expatriate footballers in Hungary
Brazilian expatriate sportspeople in Hungary
Brazilian expatriate sportspeople in Portugal
Footballers from Rio de Janeiro (city)